The Venezuela national football team represents Venezuela in men's international football and is controlled by the Venezuelan Football Federation (FVF), the governing body for football in Venezuela. They are nicknamed La Vinotinto ("Red wine") because of the traditional burgundy color of their shirts. When playing at home in official games, they usually rotate between three stadiums: The Polideportivo Cachamay in Puerto Ordaz, the Estadio José Antonio Anzoátegui in Puerto La Cruz and the Estadio Pueblo Nuevo in San Cristóbal. In friendly matches, they tend to rotate between the rest of the stadiums in the country.

Unlike other South American nations, and akin to some Caribbean nations, baseball is extremely popular in Venezuela, which diverts athletic talent away from football, contributing to its historic lack of success in CONMEBOL competitions. As of 2022, they are the only CONMEBOL side to have never qualified for the FIFA World Cup. Often Venezuela would go through entire qualification tournaments without recording a single win, although this has not happened since 1998. Until 2011, their best finish at the Copa América was fifth in their first entry, in 1967. It is only recently with the spread of the World Cup's popularity in nations where football was not the primary sport (such as Japan, the United States, and Australia) that the national team found incentives to increase player development and fan support. As of December 2019, Venezuela has the highest position on the FIFA World Ranking of any team that has not yet qualified for the World Cup, being ranked 25th.

History

Backstory
Venezuela did not participate in FIFA World Cup qualification until the 1966 qualifiers in which they were drawn with Uruguay and Peru, but failed to register a point in four games. In the 1970 qualifiers they managed to register a point, and after withdrawing from the 1974 series, repeated that in the 1978 qualifiers. The 1982 qualifiers saw them register their first win, over Bolivia. They wouldn't register another World Cup qualifying win until the 1994 series when they defeated Ecuador. A highlight of the 1998 qualifiers was goalkeeper Rafael Dudamel scoring against Argentina in a 5–2 defeat.

Despite poor results during the 1960s and 1970s, outstanding players like Luis Mendoza and Rafael Santana achieved recognition. Venezuela at that time also managed to qualify for the 1980 Summer Olympics, it first-ever major international football competition Venezuela participated in.

Richard Páez era
After José Omar Pastoriza's resignation during the 2002 World Cup qualifyings, Richard Páez took the technical direction of the national team. Finishing this process, Venezuela achieved 4 victories in a row against Uruguay, Chile, Peru, and Paraguay; winning more than 1 game in row, their first away game and not finishing in the last place for the first time in their World Cup qualifying history.

However, the team failed to qualify for both the 2002, and 2006 World Cups, gaining 12 and 18 points respectively. After this, the team advanced to the second round Copa America 2007 in Venezuela, is the first time they could reach it on this competition.

In November 2007, Páez resigned after discrepancies with media and supporters.

César Farías era
With a new coach César Farías, Venezuela national team improved their performances. At the beginning of the 2010 FIFA World Cup qualifying, Venezuela won its first game in World Cup qualifying against long unbeaten Ecuador in Quito. Something similar happened to Bolivia in La Paz, where Venezuela won for the first time at Bolivian altitude. Also, they received their first point against Brazil in qualifying. Despite not ultimately reaching the 2010, Venezuela achieved its best result in qualifying. They finished this round with 22 points in 18 matches, surpassing Peru and Bolivia for eighth place in the region.

On 6 June 2008, Venezuela achieved its second-ever triumph over Brazil, defeating the Seleção 2–0 in a friendly match in Boston, United States.
Venezuela obtained excellent results in the 2011 Copa América when they finished fourth, their highest finish in the tournament to date. With a squad composed mostly of players playing in Europe, they began 2014 FIFA World Cup qualification with a historic result (1–0) against Argentina in Puerto La Cruz, beating the Argentines for the first time.

Noel Sanvicente era

On 4 September 2014, Noel Sanvicente was made coach of the Venezuela national team. On 5 September 2014, the team lost its first match with Sanvicente under the helm 3–1 against South Korea in Bucheon.

Sanvicente's first tournament came in the 2015 Copa América, with Venezuela drawn in Group C of the competition. Their opening game finished with an upset victory over tournament favorites Colombia by 1–0, but subsequent defeats to Peru and Brazil saw La Vinotinto eliminated.

Venezuela began the World Cup qualification campaign with a 1–0 defeat against Paraguay at home, and would not earn their first point until their match against Peru, a 2–2 draw in Lima where Venezuela led until the last minute of stoppage time. Their match with Chile ended in a disappointing 4–1 defeat, Sanvicente announced his resignation a week later after mutual consent with the FVF.  At the time of Sanvicente's departure, Venezuela was last in the qualification standings with a sole point, and was unofficially eliminated.

Rafael Dudamel era
Sanvicente was replaced by former Vinotinto goalkeeper Rafael Dudamel, who decided to revamp the entire national team, by injecting the team with the promising young generation of Venezuelan players that finished second at the 2017 FIFA U-20 World Cup that was dubbed as the country's first-ever football Golden Generation. Under his coaching, La Vinotinto quickly improved and reached the quarterfinals in the Copa América Centenario, with two 1–0 wins over Jamaica and Uruguay and a 1–1 draw against Mexico in the group stage and then a 4–1 defeat to Argentina in the quarter-finals. In the 7th matchday of the 2018 World Cup qualifier, Venezuela lost to Colombia 2–0 in Barranquilla, the first loss against Los Cafeteros since 2009. Later, on matchday 11, Venezuela won for the first time in the qualifier, 5–0 over Bolivia in Maturín with a hat-trick from Josef Martínez and goals from Jacobo Kouffati and Rómulo Otero.

On 2 January 2020, Dudamel resigned from the national team.

Copa América history
Venezuela first participated at the Copa América in 1967, and finished fifth after defeating Bolivia 3–0 with a side containing Mendoza and Santana. The 1975 tournament saw Venezuela drawn in a group with Brazil and Argentina, and finished bottom with an 11–0 defeat to Argentina. In the 1979 edition, which would be the international swansong for Mendoza and Santana, they drew 0–0 with Colombia and 1–1 with Chile. A highlight of the 1989 tournament was midfielder Carlos Maldonado's four goals. In the 1993 series, Venezuela drew with Uruguay and the United States.

The team's overall Copa América record has been relatively poor (goal difference 33–145 before the 2011 Copa América), but the "Auge Vinotinto" (Vinotinto Rise) period in the early 2000s (decade) brought increased attention to the sport in the country, which in turn brought increased support from both government and private institutions. Said support contributed greatly to the "Vinotinto's" rise in quality. In 2007, during the Copa América held in Venezuela, the team progressed to the quarterfinals for the first time in its history after finishing first in a group containing Peru, Bolivia, and Uruguay. Venezuela's 2–0 victory over Peru during the competition was its first Copa América victory since 1967.

2011 Copa América
At the 2011 Copa América championship, Venezuela reached the semi-finals round for the first time by defeating Chile in the quarter-final, 2–1. Despite their commanding presence against Paraguay in their semifinal, Venezuela was unable to convert their chances into goals. They would eventually lose 5–3 to Paraguay in a penalty shootout after remaining scoreless in normal and extra time. Venezuela and Peru played for third place at the Estadio Ciudad de La Plata, where Venezuela would suffer their biggest loss of the tournament, losing 4–1 to Peru and falling into fourth place overall. Nonetheless, it was their best-ever finish at the competition.

Group B:

Results:

Team image 

Venezuela made its international debut in the Central American and Caribbean Games held in Panama in 1938, wearing the vinotinto (burgundy) color. The burgundy color originated from the uniform of the Venezuelan National Guard. In the 1967 Copa América Venezuela also wore the Peñarol shirt v Chile to avoid colors clash, as Venezuela had arrived in the Estadio Centenario (Peñarol's frequent venue) with no alternate shirts.

In 1993, a vertical band with the colors of the National flag was added to the left side of the jersey, which changed its colors to a more traditional red tone. This lasted until 1996 when Venezuela returned to the vinotinto tone.

Nevertheless, in 1998 Venezuela adopted a yellow/blue/red scheme, similar to their flag colors, by Mexican manufacturer "ABA Sports". The national team returned to the traditional color in 2000. It has been remaining (with few changes) as the main uniform up to present days.

Kit providers 
Source:

Results and fixtures

2022

2023

Coaching staff

Coaching history
Caretaker managers are listed in italics.

 Vittorio Godigna (1938)
 Sixto Soler (1944–1946)
 Álvaro Cartea (1947–1948)
 Orlando Fantoni (1951, 1955–1959)
 Miguel Ángel Gleria (1951)
 Rafael Franco (1961–1967)
 Gregorio Gómez (1967–1969)
 Rafael Gonzalez (1970-1972)
 José Julián Hernández (1972)
 Dan Georgiadis (1972–1977)
 Luis Mendoza (1981, 1989)
 Walter Roque (1981–1985)
 Rafael Santana (1985–1986, 1996)
 Carlos Horacio Moreno (1989)
 Víctor Pignanelli (1990–1992)
 Ratomir Dujković (1992–1995)
 Eduardo Borrero (1997–1998)
 José Omar Pastoriza (1998–2000)
 Richard Páez (2001–2007)
 César Farías (2007–2013)
 Manuel Plasencia (2014)
 Noel Sanvicente (2014–2016)
 Rafael Dudamel (2016–2020)
 José Peseiro (2020–2021)
 Leonardo González (2021)
 José Pékerman (2021–2023)
 Fernando Batista (2023-Present)

Players

Current squad
The following players were called up for the friendly matches against Saudi Arabia and Uzbekistan on 24 and 28 March 2023, respectively.

Caps and goals are correct as of 20 November 2022, after the match against Syria.

Friendlies not recognized by FIFA are not counted.

Recent call-ups
The following players have been called up for the team in the last 12 months.

INJ Withdrew due to injury
PRE Preliminary squad
SUS Suspended
WD Withdrew from the squad

Player records

Players in bold are still active with Venezuela.

Most capped players

Top goalscorers

Competitive record

FIFA World Cup

Copa América

 Champions   Runners-up   Third place   Fourth place

Pan American Games

See also

 Venezuela national under-23 football team
 Venezuela national under-20 football team
 Venezuela national under-17 football team
 Venezuela national futsal team

Notes

References

External links

Official site of the Venezuelan Football Federation 
Venezuela FIFA profile

 
South American national association football teams
Football in Venezuela